Tracy-sur-Loire (literally Tracy on Loire) is a commune in the Nièvre department in central France. Tracy-Sancerre station has rail connections to Nevers, Cosne-sur-Loire and Paris.

Boisgibault 
Boisgibault (or Bois Gibault) is the village that merged to form the commune Tracy-sur-Loire. It is known for its white wine Pouilly-Fumé, the Natural Reserve of Val de Loire created by decree 95-1240 on 21 November 1995, and an islet on the Loire. One can see there, in the alluvial forest and the meadows, dragonflies, 30 species of fish, 190 species of birds, beavers, 477 species of plants. This village should not be confused with Château de Boisgibault which is located about a hundred kilometers away.

See also
Communes of the Nièvre department

References

Communes of Nièvre